This is a list of franchise records for the San Jose Sharks of the National Hockey League.

Franchise records

Franchise single season
 Most wins by team: 53 in 2008–09
 Most points by team: 117 in 2008–09
 Most goals by team: 265 in 2005–06
 Fewest goals against by team: 183 in 2003–04

Franchise single game

Franchise streaks
 Longest winning streak: 11 games (2007–08), (4 games in 2011–12 + 7 games in 2012–13. All games in regular season)
 Longest losing streak: 17 games (1992–93)

Individual records

Career leaders

Single season leaders
 Most goals: Jonathan Cheechoo, 56 (2005–06)
 Most points: Joe Thornton, 114 (2006–07)
 Most assists: Joe Thornton, 92 (2006–07)
 Most PIM: Link Gaetz, 326 (1991–92)
 Most points, rookie: Pat Falloon, 59 (1991–92)
 Most goals, rookie: Logan Couture, 32 (2010-2011)
 Most points, defenseman: Erik Karlsson, 83 (2022–23)
 Most games played: Evgeni Nabokov, 77 (2007–08) 
 Most minutes: Evgeni Nabokov, 4,560 (2007–08)
 Most goaltending wins: Evgeni Nabokov, 46 (2007–08) 
 Most shutouts: Evgeni Nabokov, 9 (2003–04)
 Most consecutive starts: Evgeni Nabokov, 43 (to begin the 2007–08 NHL season)
 Lowest GAA†: Vesa Toskala, 2.06 (2003–04)
 Highest save %†: Evgeni Nabokov, 0.930 (2003–04)
 † Goalie must play at least 25 games

Single game leaders
 Most PIM, single regulation game: Jody Shelley, 41 (2007–08)
 Most points, single playoff game: Jeremy Roenick, 4 (2007–08)
Most points, single playoff period: Kevin Labanc, 4 (2018-19)
 Most goals, single game: Timo Meier, 5 (2021-22)

References

Records
National Hockey League statistical records